The Madrid–Valencia railway is the conventional railway line linking the Spanish capital Madrid with the country's third largest city of Valencia in the Valencian Community. It now primarily serves local commuter rail services and regional traffic since the opening of the Madrid–Levante high-speed rail network in 2010.

History
Prior to the opening of the high-speed rail line between Madrid and Valencia, the classic Iberian gauge railway provided a travel time of 3 hours and 30 minutes between the two cities.

Services
The line is used by Cercanías Madrid's C-3 service and the C-3 of Cercanías Valencia; along with numerous regional services along various stretches of the line. The Regional Express service runs the full distance between Madrid and Valencia, taking 6 hours and 36 minutes with stops at numerous intermediate stations; since the opening of the AVE high-speed rail line travel has been reduced to 1 hour and 40 minutes non-stop, freeing up the older slower line for other traffic.

References

Railway lines in Spain
Railway lines opened in 1851
Iberian gauge railways
Rail transport in the Community of Madrid
Transport in Castilla–La Mancha
Transport in the Valencian Community